Bala Kumar is an Indian actor and director, who works in Malayalam and Tamil cinema. He made his debut in the Telugu film 2 Much (2002). He is well known for his supporting roles; in films such as Big B (2007), Sound of Boot (2008), Puthiya Mukham (2009), Hero (2012), Veeram (2014), Ennu Ninte Moideen (2015), Pulimurugan (2016), Aanakkallan (2018), Lucifer (2019), and Thambi (2019).

Early life
Bala was born into a family closely associated with the film industry, with his grandfather being the owner of the Arunachala Studios. His father, Jeyakumar, directed over 350 films and documentaries, while his brother Siva has worked as a director and cinematographer in south Indian films.

Career
He made his debut in the Tamil film Anbu (2003). Since then he acted and found success in a number of Malayalam films. He received appreciation for his role in the 2009 film Puthiya Mukham. He made a comeback to Tamil cinema in 2014 with the Ajith Kumar-starrer Veeram. The film, directed by his brother Siva, the film was a critical and commercial success.

Bala made his directorial debut with the 2012 Malayalam action film The Hitlist, in which he played the leading role. In 2015 and 2016, he performed notable supporting roles in the period romantic drama Ennu Ninte Moideen and the action film Pulimurugan, and Lucifer in 2019, all three were the highest-grossing Malayalam films of all time.

Personal life

On 27 August 2010, he married Idea Star Singer-fame Malayali singer Amrutha Suresh. They have a daughter, Avantika, born in September 2012. The couple divorced in 2019 after living separately for three years.

On 5 September 2021, he married Elizabeth Udayan, who is a doctor by profession.

Filmography

Films

Television

References

External links
 
 
 Bala on Msidb

Tamil male actors
Living people
Male actors in Malayalam cinema
Indian male film actors
Male actors in Tamil cinema
21st-century Indian male actors
Male actors from Chennai
Male actors in Telugu cinema
Year of birth missing (living people)